HMS Cromer, after the Norfolk town of Cromer can refer to any of three Royal Navy ships:

 , a Britomart-class wooden screw gunboat launched in 1867 and sold in 1886 for breaking up.
 , a  lost in 1942
 , a  launched in 1990 and decommissioned in 2001. Converted to a static harbour training ship in Dartmouth, Hindostan.

See also

References
 

Royal Navy ship names